Jumia is a Pan-African technology company that is built around a marketplace, logistics service and payment service. The logistics service enables the delivery of packages through a network of local partners while the payment services facilitate the payments of online transactions within Jumia’s ecosystem. It has partnered with more than 100,000 active sellers and individuals and is a direct competitor to Konga in Nigeria and Amazon in Egypt.

History 
In 2012, Jeremy Hodara and Sacha Poignonnec, ex-McKinsey consultants, founded Jumia along with Tunde Kehinde and Raphael Kofi Afaedor.

Jumia was launched in Nigeria in 2012 and expanded to five other countries : Egypt, Morocco, Ivory Coast, Kenya and South Africa. In 2014, the company launched offices in Tunisia, Tanzania , Ghana , Cameroon , Algeria and Uganda , and by 2018 it was present in 14 African countries. In Egypt, Jumia has been trying to categorize itself as one of the leading e-commerce websites.

In June 2013, Jumia launched Jumia Travel, a hotel booking platform, and Jumia Food, a food delivery platform. Jumia Deals was launched in April 2015. In 2017, Jumia launched Jumia One, an app that enables customers to pay bills such as airtime. The same year, Jumia launched JumiaPay, a secure payment for people to shop on all Jumia services. This was followed by the Jumia lending program, an initiative that allows its vendors to access business loans.

In South Africa, Jumia operates under the brand name Zando (zando.co.za), focusing only on online fashion retail.

At the end of 2015, the founders of Jumia appointed Juliet Anammah as the CEO of Jumia Nigeria so that they could concentrate on global control of the company. Massimiliano Spalazzi took over from Juliet as CEO in Nigeria in January 2020 and Juliet was appointed as the chairwoman of Jumia Nigeria and the Head of Institutional Affairs, Africa.

In 2015, Jumia generated $234 million in revenue, which stands for a 265% growth from 2014.
In 2016, Jumia became the continent’s first unicorn being valued over 1 billion USD. 
In late November 2018, Jumia partnered with cryptocurrency company Telcoin to enhance payment service capabilities throughout their areas of operation. The same month, Jumia and Carrefour signed a partnership to sell online products in Africa.

In April 2019, Jumia went public on the New York Stock Exchange (NYSE) and raised $196 million in net proceeds. The share price, initially offered at $14.50, rose more than 200% in the first three trading sessions. The first analyst papers release 21 days after the IPO rated the company at stock targets between 27 and 40 USD. After reaching a peak of nearly $50 on 1 May 2019, the share value has declined to under $5/share by year's end.

In November 2019, Jumia announced the suspension of its e-commerce operations in Cameroon effective on 18 November as the company concluded that its transactional portal is currently not suitable to the current environment in Cameroon. 
As part of the portfolio optimization effort, Jumia later ceased operations in Tanzania effective on 27 November 2019. While Jumia operations in Tanzania provided many opportunities for customers and vendors, the company said it needed to focus its resources on other markets that can bring the best value and help Jumia thrive. The decision, the company affirmed, would help it achieve greater success in the future.
On 9 December 2019, Jumia suspended Jumia Food in Rwanda, making it the 3rd country in two months as part of a continuous monitoring of the business environment and operating costs in the markets in which it operates. Jumia, however, vowed to continue doing business online in those countries on the classifieds portals, previously called Jumia Deals.

On 9 December 2019, Travelstart entered into a distribution and commercial agreement with Jumia Travel, Jumia’s hotel booking platform, to power the latter’s pan-African online travel booking portal. Under the agreement, Travelstart took control of the sales, fulfilment and customer service aspects of Jumia Travel online booking websites in all its operating territories.

In 2020, Jumia experienced a shift in shopping habits across its markets in Africa as more shoppers bought everyday products as opposed to electronics. Shopping for essentials such as foodstuff, fashion and beauty products saw Jumia’s total sales value of Fast-Moving Consumer Goods grow by 13 percentage points last year, from 44% in 2019, according to the Jumia Africa E-commerce Index 2021.

In 2020, Jumia ranked 7th among the top 10 influential brands in Egypt.

In 2021, Jumia launched its technology centre in Egypt to provide its services to the Egyptian market as well as Africa at large.

COVID-19 accelerated the growth of e-commerce and digital entrepreneurship in Africa and more women have embraced digital business. On the Jumia platform, over a third of businesses in Côte d'Ivoire and over half in Kenya and Nigeria are owned by women according to IFC.

In November 2022, Jumia announced leadership changes to support its journey towards profitability with the appointment of a new Management Board and Acting CEO, while Jeremy Hodara and Sacha Poignonnec, Co-CEOs, resigned from their roles.  The Supervisory Board appointed Francis Dufay as Acting CEO and elevated Antoine Maillet-Mezeray to Executive Vice President Finance & Operations. 

In February 2023, the Supervisory Board appointed Francis Dufay as CEO after spending three months as acting CEO of Jumia.

Partnerships 
On 16 March 2020, Jumia announced a major partnership with Reckitt Benckiser, a global health products manufacturer, to provide a steady supply of hygiene products at affordable pricing and help hamper the spread of the Coronavirus.

In May 2020, The United Nations Development Programme (UNDP) in partnership with Jumia Uganda, launched an online platform to enable small and medium enterprises to connect with consumers to sustain livelihoods in view of restrictions on movement, stay at home measures and social distancing guidelines which were instituted as part of the measures to curtail further transmission of the novel coronavirus (COVID-19) pandemic.

In September 2020, the Moroccan Ministry of handicrafts teamed up with Jumia to help artisans sell their products online and alleviate the impact of the coronavirus pandemic, which affected the craft industry and other sectors of the economy of the North African Kingdom.

In December 2020, Jumia announced a partnership with Egypt Post to boost and develop e-commerce trade flows and industry in Egypt.

In December 2021, UNICEF and Jumia partnered to help Giga connect schools in Africa to the Internet and every young person to information, opportunity, and choice.

In February 2022, Jumia announced a partnership with LocQar, a smart locker company, to bring online deliveries closer to its consumers in Ghana, ensuring that customers who order items on Jumia get to pick up their packages quicker, safer and conveniently.

In September 2022, a partnership was announced with Zipline for deliveries dropped from their robotic aircraft. In addition, a partnership with Coca Cola was announced to provide online shopping to consumers in Africa.

Logistics 
Jumia has a logistics network, which includes among its physical locations over 20 warehouses and more than 1,300 drop-off stations and pick-up stations, located across Jumia’s 11-country market, including remote areas. In 2020, Jumia announced that its logistics service is now available for use by third parties who wish to leverage its network, technology and expertise for last-mile deliveries across 11 countries in Africa.

In August 2021, Jumia partnered with modern eco-friendly mobility company, Solar Taxi to provide affordable and eco-friendly delivery of online orders for consumers in Ghana as the company looks to achieve a fully green footprint through the use of clean and sustainable renewable energy.

In November 2022, Jumia announced that it will be scaling back its logistics-as-a-service offering and will only be available in 3 countries (Nigeria, Ivory Coast and Morocco). Jumia Prime will also be suspended.

Payment 
In December 2021, Jumia launched a payment service provider (PSP), JumiaPay in Egypt upon regulatory approval.  The PSP came as part of Jumia’s strategic partnership with the National Bank of Egypt, with an objective of facilitating online payments as well as the distribution of various digital and financial services.

Websites 
Jumia Nigeria's ecommerce website, Jumia.com.ng, is ranked number 1,503 in global internet engagement and the thirteenth most visited website in Nigeria in late April 2020, according to Alexa.com - a global internet traffic ranking firm.  It is the sixth most-visited local website in Nigeria, as of April 2020, following a recent listing by IABC Africa Media.

Short seller research 
In May 2019, the short-seller Andrew Left of Citron Research referenced Jumia as a "securities fraud", citing material discrepancies regarding key financial metrics among a confidential investor presentation and Jumia’s F-1 filing to the SEC from its April 2019 IPO. Andrew Left is known on Wall Street for making several claims of fraud and has faced calls to be investigated.
Jumia's share price sank more than 50% in one week after the report was published. Citigroup, one of Jumia’s IPO underwriters, released a report debunking most of Citron’s allegations but noted that, “Jumia could do more to provide disclosure on some aspects of its operations, as a matter of transparency and best practice.”

Investors 
In 2012, Kasuwa (which means Market in Hausa Language) was launched with the support of Rocket Internet, MTN, and Millicom, and was later renamed Jumia Group. In March 2016, Jumia Group secured over €300M of funding from MTN, Rocket Internet, AXA, Goldman Sachs, Orange and CDC.

As of 2019, the largest shareholder was MTN Group.

In December 2018, Pernod Ricard invested in Jumia.

In March 2019, Jumia received 50 million euros in investments from Mastercard.

In 2020, Rocket Internet and MTN Group sold stake in Jumia.

Awards and recognition 
 2013 Brand Journalists Association of Nigeria Awards (Online Retail Brand of the Year) 
 2013 World Retail Awards
 2014 Best Online Retail Brand of the Year Award 
 2015: E-commerce Customer Service Excellence Awards 
 2016: Jumia ranked 82nd in the Top WIRED 100 list 
 2017: Jumia is listed among the Massachusetts Institute of Technology’s Smartest Companies 2017. Ranking 47 on the list, Jumia is the only African company named in MIT's top 50 smartest companies.
 2019: Jumia crowned Tunisia's best e-shop 
 2019: eCommerce Company of the Year Award in Nigeria 
2019: Chartered Institute of Marketing Ghana eCommerce Company of the Year
2021: Ecommerce Website of the Year in Kenya 
2021: Best Loyalty Programme in Kenya 
2021: Best Logistics in Nigeria - Unilever 
2022: E-Commerce Website of the Year in Nigeria 
2022: HR Best Practice in E-Commerce Sector

See also
 Noon
 Souq

References

External links

Online retailers of Nigeria
Retail companies established in 2012
Internet properties established in 2012
Multinational companies based in Lagos
Rocket Internet
2019 initial public offerings
Companies listed on the New York Stock Exchange
Nigerian companies established in 2012
Nigerian brands